= List of schools in Labuan =

This is a list of schools in Labuan, Malaysia. It is categorised according to the by kpm., and is arranged alphabetically.

== Primary education: Sekolah Kebangsaan (SK) ==
- SK Tanjung Aru, Peti Surat 80994, 81097, 87019 Labuan, Wilayah Persekutuan
- SK Sungai Lada, Peti Surat 81097, 87020 Labuan, Wilayah Persekutuan
- SK Sungai Bedaun, Peti Surat 81097, 87020 Labuan, Wilayah Persekutuan
- SK Simpang K.A.N Sahri, Peti Surat 87000, 87000 Labuan, Wilayah Persekutuan
- SKK St Anne'S Convent, Peti Surat 82196, 87032 Labuan, Wilayah Persekutuan
- SKK Rancha-Rancha, Peti Surat 80355, 87013 Labuan, Wilayah Persekutuan
- SK Pekan II Wp Labuan, Peti Surat 81737, 87027 Labuan, Wilayah Persekutuan
- SK Pekan 1 Wp Labuan, Peti Surat 81104, 87021 Labuan, Wilayah Persekutuan
- SK Patau-Patau, Peti Surat 81416, 87024 Labuan, Wilayah Persekutuan
- SK Pantai, Peti Surat 81361, 87023 Labuan, Wilayah Persekutuan
- SK Membedai, Peti Surat 82074, 87030 Labuan, Wilayah Persekutuan
- SK Lubok Temiang, Peti Surat 80787, 87017 Labuan, Wilayah Persekutuan
- SK Layang-Layangan, Peti Surat 82265, 87032 Labuan, Wilayah Persekutuan
- SK Kerupang, Peti Surat 80277, 87013 Labuan, Wilayah Persekutuan
- SK Bukit Kalam, Peti Surat 81097, 87020 Labuan, Wilayah Persekutuan
- SK Bebuloh, Peti Surat 81332, 87023 Labuan, Wilayah Persekutuan
- SJK (C) Chung Hwa, Peti Surat 81235, 87008 Labuan, Wilayah Persekutuan
- SJK (C) Chi Wen, P.O.Box 136, 87008 Labuan, Wilayah Persekutuan

=== Secondary education: Sekolah Menengah Kebangsaan (SMK) ===
| School code | School name | Postcode | Area | Coordinates |
|---|---|---|---|---|
| WEE1011 | SMK Labuan | 87021 | Labuan | 5.2869°N 115.2542°E |
| WEA1002 | SMK Lajau | 87025 | Labuan | 5.3478°N 115.2367°E |
| WEE1015 | SMK Mutiara | 87027 | Labuan | 5.3125°N 115.2286°E |
| WEA1004 | SMK Pantai | 87027 | Labuan | 5.3206°N 115.2308°E |
| WEA1005 | SMK Rancha-Rancha | 87024 | Labuan | 5.3067°N 115.1869°E |
| WFE1019 | SMK St Anne | 87020 | Labuan | 5.2867°N 115.2544°E |
| WFE1022 | SMK St Anthony | 87023 | Labuan | 5.2861°N 115.2550°E |
| WEA1003 | SMK Taman Perumahan Bedaun | 87028 | Labuan | 5.2925°N 115.2103°E |

- SM Sains Labuan (SMSL), Peti Surat 82206, 87032 Labuan, Wilayah Persekutuan
- SMA Majlis Agama Islam Wilayah Persekutuan Labuan (SMA MAIWPL), Peti Surat 81043,87021 Wilayah Persekutuan Labuan

== College ==
- Kolej Matrikulasi Labuan, Jalan OKK Daud Merinding, P.O Box 81735, 87027 Labuan, Wilayah Persekutuan
- Kolej Vokasional Labuan, Peti Surat 80276, 87013 Labuan, Wilayah Persekutuan

== Others ==
- SM Sains Labuan, Peti Surat 82206, 87032 Labuan, Wilayah Persekutuan
- Labuan International School
- Sekolah Menengah Agama MAIWP
